Huai Phueng is a district (amphoe) in the eastern part of Kalasin province, northeastern Thailand.

Geography
Neighboring districts are (from the east clockwise): Na Khu, Kuchinarai, Na Mon, and Somdet of Kalasin Province, and Phu Phan of Sakon Nakhon province.

History
On 5 May 1981 the minor district (king amphoe) Huai Phueng was created by splitting off the three tambons Nikhom Huai Phueng, Kham Bong, and Khai Nun from Khao Wong district. It was upgraded to a full district on 21 May 1990.

Administration
The district is divided into four sub-districts (tambons), which are further subdivided into 52 villages (mubans). Huai Phueng is a township (thesaban tambon) which covers parts of tambon Nikhom Huai Phueng. There are a further four tambon administrative organizations (TAO).

References

External links
amphoe.com

Huai Phueng